Ancient literature comprises religious and scientific documents, tales, poetry and plays, royal edicts and declarations, and other forms of writing that were recorded on a variety of media, including stone, clay tablets, papyri, palm leaves, and metal. Before the spread of writing, oral literature did not always survive well, but some texts and fragments have persisted. One can conclude that an unknown number of written works too have likely not survived the ravages of time and are therefore lost.

Incomplete list of ancient texts

Bronze Age

Early Bronze Age: 3rd millennium BC (approximate dates shown). The earliest written literature dates from about 2600 BC (classical Sumerian). The earliest literary author known by name is Enheduanna, a Sumerian priestess and public figure dating to ca. 24th century BC.
Certain literary texts are difficult to date, such as the Egyptian Book of the Dead, which was recorded in the Papyrus of Ani around 1240 BC, but other versions of the book probably date from about the 18th century BC.
 2600: Sumerian texts from Abu Salabikh, including the Instructions of Shuruppak and the Kesh temple hymn
 2600: Egyptian The Life of Metjen, from Saqqara
 2500: Egyptian Diary of Merer (Oldest papyrus)
 2400: Egyptian Pyramid Texts, including the Cannibal Hymn
 2400: Sumerian Code of Urukagina
 2400: Egyptian Palermo stone
 2350: Egyptian The Maxims of Ptahhotep
 2270: Sumerian Enheduanna's Hymns
 2250: Egyptian Autobiography of Weni
 2250–2000: Earliest Sumerian stories in the Epic of Gilgamesh
 2200: Egyptian Autobiography of Harkhuf
 2100: Sumerian Curse of Agade
 2100: Sumerian Debate between Bird and Fish
 2050: Sumerian Code of Ur-Nammu
 2000: Egyptian Coffin Texts
 2000: Sumerian Lament for Ur
 2000: Sumerian Enmerkar and the Lord of Aratta

Middle Bronze Age: ca. 2000 to 1600 BC (approximate dates shown)
 2000–1900: Egyptian Tale of the Shipwrecked Sailor
 1950: Akkadian Laws of Eshnunna
 1900: Akkadian Legend of Etana
 1900: Sumerian Code of Lipit-Ishtar
 1859–1840: Egyptian The Eloquent Peasant
 1859–1840: Egyptian Story of Sinuhe (in Hieratic)
 1859–1840: Egyptian Dispute between a man and his Ba
 1859–1813: Egyptian Loyalist Teaching
 1850: Akkadian Kultepe texts
 1800: Akkadian Enûma Eliš
 1780: Akkadian Mari letters, including the Epic of Zimri-Lim
 1754: Akkadian Code of Hammurabi stele
 1750: Hittite Anitta text
 1700: Akkadian Atra-Hasis epic
 1700: Egyptian Westcar Papyrus
 1700: Akkadian Epic of Gilgamesh
 1650: Egyptian Ipuwer Papyrus
 1600: Akkadian Eridu Genesis

Late Bronze Age: ca. 1600 to 1200 BC (approximate dates shown)
 1600: Hittite Code of the Nesilim
 1500–1200: Sanskrit Rig Veda 
 1550: Egyptian Instruction of Any
 1500: Akkadian Poor Man of Nippur
 1500: Hittite military oath
 1500–1200: Ugaritic Legend of Keret
 1500–1300: Ugaritic Baal Cycle
 1550: Egyptian Book of the Dead
 1500: Akkadian Dynasty of Dunnum
 1400: Akkadian Marriage of Nergal and Ereshkigal
 1400: Akkadian Autobiography of Kurigalzu
 1400: Akkadian Amarna letters
 1350: Ugaritic Tale of Aqhat
 1330: Egyptian Great Hymn to the Aten
 1300: Egyptian Instruction of Amenemope
 1240: Egyptian Papyrus of Ani, Book of the Dead
 1200–900: Akkadian version and younger stories in the Epic of Gilgamesh
 1200: Akkadian Tukulti-Ninurta Epic
 1200: Egyptian Tale of Two Brothers

Iron Age

Iron Age texts predating Classical Antiquity: 12th to 8th centuries BC
 1200–800: BC approximate date of the Vedic Sanskrit
Yajurveda
Atharvaveda
Samaveda
 1050: BC Egyptian Story of Wenamun
 1050: BC Akkadian Sakikkū (SA.GIG) "Diagnostic Omens" by Esagil-kin-apli.
 1050: BC The Babylonian Theodicy of Šaggil-kīnam-ubbib.
 1000: BC Chinese Classic of Poetry (Shījīng)
 1000: BC Akkadian Dialogue of Pessimism
 900: BC Akkadian Epic of Erra
 900: BC Vedic Sanskrit Aranyaka

Classical Antiquity

9th century BC
Classic of Changes (I Ching)

8th century BC
 Greek Trojan War cycle, including the Iliad and the Odyssey
 800–500 BC: Vedic Sanskrit 
Brahmanas
Brihadaranyaka Upanishad
Isha Upanishad
Chandogya Upanishad
Aitareya Upanishad
Taittiriya Upanishad

7th century BC
 Vedic Sanskrit
Shulba Sutra (containing geometry related to fire-altar construction)
Manava Sulbasutra 
Baudhayana sutra
 Shatapatha Brahmana – Commentary on the Vedas
 Nirukta (technical treatise on etymology, lexical category and the semantics of Sanskrit words)
 Kausitaka Upanishad
 Greek:
 Hesiod: The Theogony and Works and Days
 Archilochus
 Alcman
 Semonides of Amorgos
 Solon
 Mimnermus
 Stesichorus
 Paleo-Hebrew alphabet
 Ketef Hinnom amulets, the oldest found Biblical text (amulets with the Priestly Blessing, which are recorded in the Book of Numbers)
Classic of Documents (Shūjīng) (authentic portions)

6th century BC
 Persian:
Cyrus Cylinder
 Sanskrit:
Sushruta: Sushruta Samhita (Book on Surgery and Medicine)
Kapila: Samkhya-sutra, Kapilanyayabhasa, Kapila Gita, Dṛṣṭantara Yoga
Kanada: Vaiśeṣika Sūtra (Book on Atomism)
 
Kashyapa Samhhita (Book on Medicine)
Pratishakhyas
 Greek:
 Sappho
 Ibycus
 Alcaeus of Mytilene
 Aesop's Fables

5th century BC
 Sanskrit:
Pāṇini:Aṣṭādhyāyī
 Kenopanishad
Apastamba: Apastamba Dharmasutra, Apastambha Smriti 
 Avestan: Yasht
 Chinese:
 Spring and Autumn Annals (Chūnqiū) (722–481 BC, chronicles of the state of Lu)
 Confucius: Analects (Lúnyǔ)
 Classic of Rites (Lǐjì)
 Commentaries of Zuo (Zuǒzhuàn)
 Mozi: Mozi (book) (Mòzǐ)
 Sun Tzu: The Art of War (Sūnzǐ Bīngfǎ)
 Greek:
 Pindar: Odes
 Herodotus: The Histories of Herodotus
 Thucydides: History of the Peloponnesian War
 Aeschylus: The Suppliants, The Persians, Seven Against Thebes, Oresteia
 Sophocles: Oedipus Rex, Oedipus at Colonus, Antigone, Electra and other plays
 Euripides: Alcestis, Medea, Heracleidae, Hippolytus, Andromache, Hecuba, The Suppliants, Electra, Heracles, Trojan Women, Iphigeneia in Tauris, Ion, Helen, Phoenician Women, Orestes, Bacchae, Iphigeneia at Aulis, Cyclops, Rhesus
 Aristophanes: The Acharnians, The Knights, The Clouds, The Wasps, Peace, The Birds, Lysistrata, Thesmophoriazusae, The Frogs, Ecclesiazousae, Plutus
 Hebrew: date of the extant text of the Torah

4th century BC
 Sanskrit:
 Katha Upanishad
 Prashnopanishad
 Mundaka Upanishad
 Māṇḍūkya Upanishad
Bhadrabahu: Kalpa Sūtra
Chankaya: Arthshastra, Chanakya Neeti
Salihotra: Shalihotra Samhita (treatise on veterinary medicine)
Vyasa: Mahabharata, Puranas, Brahma Sutras
Jaimini: Mimamsa Sutras, Jaimini Sutras, Ashvamedhika Parva
Valmiki : Ramayana
Bhāsa: Svapnavāsavadattam, Pancarātra, Pratijna Yaugandharayaanam, Pratimanātaka, Abhishekanātaka, Bālacharita, Karnabhāram, Dūtaghaṭotkaca, Chārudatta, Madhyamavyayoga and Urubhanga.
 Pali: Tipitaka
 Hebrew: Book of Job, beginning of Hebrew wisdom literature
 Chinese:
 Laozi (or Lao Tzu): Tao Te Ching
 Zhuangzi: Zhuangzi (book)
 Mencius: Mencius
 Shang Yang: The Book of Lord Shang (Shāng jūn shū)
 Persian:
DNa inscription
 Greek:
Xenophon: Anabasis, Cyropaedia, Oeconomicus, Memorabilia, Hellenica
 Aristotle: Nicomachean Ethics, Metaphysics, Organon, Physics, Historia Animalium, De Partibus Animalium, De Motu Animalium, De Mundo, De Caelo, Poetics, Politics, Magna Moralia, Eudemian Ethics
 Plato: Euthyphro, Apology, Crito, Theaetetus, Parmenides, Symposium, Phaedrus, Protagoras, Gorgias, Meno, Republic, Timaeus, Critias, Laws, Menexenus, Phaedo, Lysis, Alcibiades I, Alcibiades II, Hippias minor, Epinomis, Minos, Hipparchus, Ion
 Euclid: Elements
 Menander: Dyskolos
 Theophrastus: Enquiry into Plants

3rd century BC
 Avestan: Avesta
 Etruscan: Liber Linteus Zagrabiensis (Linen Book of Zagreb)
 Sanskrit:
 Pingala: Chandaḥśāstra
Moggaliputta-Tissa: Kathāvatthu
Kātyāyana: Vārttikakāra, Śulbasūtras
Vishnu Sharma: Panchatantra
 Vedanga Jyotisha
Bharata Muni: Natya Shastra (A theoretical treatise on classical Indian dance and drama)

 Sinhalese (Elu): Sīhalattakathā or Hela Atuwā (Pali commentaries of Buddhist teachings that were translated into Sinhalese after the introduction of Buddhism to Sri Lanka)
Tamil:
 3rd century BC to 3rd century AD: Sangam poems
 Tolkāppiyam (grammar book)
Korakkar(3rd century BC),Siddhar, Physician, Philosopher
Bogar(3rd century BC)Siddhar, Physician, Yogi
Agattiyam

 Hebrew: Ecclesiastes
 Greek:
 Apollonius of Rhodes: Argonautica
 Callimachus (310/305-240 B.C.), lyric poet
 Manetho: Aegyptiaca
 Theocritus, lyric poet
 Latin:
 Lucius Livius Andronicus ( — ), translator, founder of Roman drama
 Gnaeus Naevius ( — 201 BC), dramatist, epic poet
 Titus Maccius Plautus ( — 184 BC), dramatist, composer of comedies: Poenulus, Miles Gloriosus, and other plays
 Quintus Fabius Pictor (3rd century BC), historian
 Lucius Cincius Alimentus (3rd century BC), military historian and antiquarian

2nd century BC
 Sanskrit
 Patanjali(Founder of Yoga School of Philosophy):Mahābhāṣya(Treatise on grammar and linguistics),Patanjalatantra(medical text), Yoga sūtras
Badrayana(Founder of Vedanta School of Philosophy):Brahma Sutras
Manu:Manusmriti(Laws of Manu)

 Avestan: Vendidad
 Chinese: Sima Qian: Records of the Grand Historian (Shǐjì)
 Aramaic: Book of Daniel
 Hebrew: Sirach
 Greek
 Polybius: The Histories
 Book of Wisdom
 Septuagint
 Latin:
 Terence (195/185 BC — 159 BC), comic dramatist: The Brothers, The Girl from Andros, Eunuchus, The Self-Tormentor
 Quintus Ennius (239 BC — ), poet
 Marcus Pacuvius ( — 130 BC), tragic dramatist, poet
 Statius Caecilius (220 BC — 168/166 BC), comic dramatist
 Marcius Porcius Cato (234 BC — 149 BC), generalist, topical writer
 Gaius Acilius (2nd century BC), historian
 Lucius Accius (170 BC — ), tragic dramatist, philologist
 Gaius Lucilius ( — 103/2 BC), satirist
 Quintus Lutatius Catulus (2nd century BC), public officer, epigrammatist
 Aulus Furius Antias (2nd century BC), poet
 Gaius Julius Caesar Strabo Vopiscus (130 BC — 87 BC), public officer, tragic dramatist
 Lucius Pomponius Bononiensis (2nd century BC), comic dramatist, satirist
 Lucius Cassius Hemina (2nd century BC), historian
 Lucius Calpurnius Piso Frugi (2nd century BC), historian
 Manius Manilius (2nd century BC), public officer, jurist
 Lucius Coelius Antipater (2nd century BC), jurist, historian
 Publius Sempronius Asellio (158 BC — after 91 BC), military officer, historian
 Gaius Sempronius Tuditanus (2nd century BC), jurist
 Lucius Afranius (2nd & 1st centuries BC), comic dramatist
 Titus Albucius (2nd & 1st centuries BC), orator
 Publius Rutilius Rufus (158 BC — after 78 BC), jurist
 Quintus Lutatius Catulus (2nd & 1st centuries BC), public officer, poet
 Lucius Aelius Stilo Praeconinus (154 BC — 74 BC), philologist
 Quintus Claudius Quadrigarius (2nd & 1st centuries BC), historian
 Valerius Antias (2nd & 1st centuries BC), historian
 Lucius Cornelius Sisenna (121 BC — 67 BC), soldier, historian
 Quintus Cornificius (2nd & 1st centuries BC), rhetorician

1st century BC

 Pali (Sri Lanka): Pāli Tripiṭaka (Written under the patronage of King Vattagamani of Anuradhapura in Aluhihare, Matale)
 Latin:
 Cicero: Catiline Orations, Pro Caelio, Dream of Scipio
 Julius Caesar: Gallic Wars, Civil War
 Virgil: Eclogues, Georgics and Aeneid
 Lucretius: On the Nature of Things
 Livy: History of Rome (Ab Urbe Condita)

1st century AD
 Sanskrit
 Śabara:Sābara-bhāṣyam
Gunadhara:Kasayapahuda
Aśvaghoṣa:Buddhacharita (Acts of the Buddha),Saundarananda, Sutralankara
 Chinese: Ban Gu: Book of Han (Hànshū)
 Greek:
 Plutarch: Lives of the Noble Greeks and Romans
 Josephus: The Jewish War, Antiquities of the Jews, Against Apion
 The books of the New Testament of the Christian Bible and the Didache
 Latin: see Classical Latin
 Tacitus: Germania
 Ovid: Metamorphoses; also Tristia and Epistulae ex Ponto written during his exile
 Pliny the Elder: Natural History
 Petronius: Satyricon
 Seneca the Younger: Phaedra, Dialogues
 Statius: Thebaid; also Silvae and unfinished Achilleid

2nd century
 Sanskrit: Aśvaghoṣa: Buddhacharita  (Acts of the Buddha)
 Pahlavi:
 Yadegar-e Zariran (Memorial of Zarēr)
 Visperad
 Drakht-i Asurig (The Babylonian Tree)
 Greek:
 Arrian: Anabasis Alexandri
 Marcus Aurelius: Meditations
 Epictetus and Arrian: Enchiridion
 Ptolemy: Almagest
 Athenaeus: The Banquet of the Learned
 Pausanias: Description of Greece
 Longus: Daphnis and Chloe
 Lucian: True History
 The Shepherd of Hermas
 Latin: see Classical Latin
 Apuleius: The Golden Ass
 Lucius Ampelius: Liber Memorialis
 Suetonius: Lives of the Twelve Caesars
 Tertullian: Apologeticus

3rd century
 Avestan: Khordeh Avesta (Zoroastrian prayer book)
 Pahlavi: Mani: Shabuhragan (Manichaean holy book)
 Chinese:
 Chen Shou: Records of Three Kingdoms (Sānguó Zhì)
 Zhang Hua: Bowuzhi
 Greek: Plotinus: Enneads
 Latin: see Late Latin
 Distichs of Cato
 Hebrew: Mishnah
Pali (Sri Lanka): Dīpavaṃsa

Late Antiquity

4th century
 Latin: see Late Latin
 Augustine of Hippo: Confessions, On Christian Doctrine
 Faltonia Betitia Proba: Cento Vergilianus de laudibus Christi ("A Virgilian Cento Concerning the Glory of Christ")
 Apicius (De re coquinaria, "On the Subject of Cooking")
 Pervigilium Veneris ("Vigil of Venus")
 Sanskrit
Asanga:Dharma-dharmata-vibhaga(Distinguishing Phenomena and Pure Being), Mahāyānasaṃgraha (Summary of the Great Vehicle)
Vasubandhu:Verses on the Treasury of the Abhidharma, Pañcaskandhaprakaraṇa (Explanation of the Five Aggregates), Pañcaskandhaprakaraṇa (Explanation of the Five Aggregates),Vyākhyāyukti ("Proper Mode of Exposition"), Vādavidhi ("Rules for Debate"), Dharmadharmatāvibhāgavṛtti (Commentary on Distinguishing Elements from Reality), Madhyāntavibhāgabhāṣya (Commentary on Distinguishing the Middle from the Extremes), Mahāyānasūtrālaṃkārabhāṣya (Commentary on the Ornament to the Great Vehicle Discourses)
Dignāga:Pramāṇa-samuccaya (Compendium of Valid Cognition),Hetucakra (The wheel of reason)
Haribhadra:Anekāntajayapatākā [The Victory Banner of Anekantavada (Relativism)],Dhūrtākhyāna (The Rogue's Stories),Yogadṛṣṭisamuccaya (An Array of Views on Yoga),Ṣaḍdarśanasamuccaya (Compendium of Six Philosophies)
 Syriac: Aphrahat, Ephrem the Syrian
 Aramaic: Jerusalem Talmud
Pali (Sri Lanka): Mahāvaṃsa

5th century
 Armenian:
 Movses Khorenatsi (historian): History of Armenia
 Chinese:
 Bao Zhao: Fu on the Ruined City (蕪城賦, Wú chéng fù)
 Fan Ye: Book of the Later Han (後漢書, Hòuhànshū)
 Sanskrit: 
 Kālidāsa (speculated): Abhijñānaśākuntalam (अभिज्ञान शाकुन्तलम्, "The Recognition of Shakuntala"), Meghadūta (मेघदूत, "Cloud Messenger"), Vikramōrvaśīyam (विक्रमोर्वशीयम्, "Urvashi Won by Valour", play)
Pujyapada:Iṣṭopadeśa (Divine Sermons), Sarvārthasiddhi (Attainment of Higher Goals), Jainendra Vyākaraṇa (Jainendra Grammar), Samādhitantra (Method of SelfContemplation), Daśabhaktyādisangraha (Collection of Ten Adorations),Śabdāvatāranyāsa (Arrangement of Words and their Forms)
 Aryabhata: Aryabhatiya
Kamandaka:Nitisara(The Elements of Polity)
Bodhidharma:Two Entrances and Four Practices, Treatise on Realizing the Nature, Refuting Signs Treatise
Bhartṛhari:Vākyapadīya(Treatise on Sanskrit grammar and linguistic philosophy), Śatakatraya(The three hundred poems of moral values)
Siddhasena:Nyāyāvatāra, Sanmati sutra, Kalyan Mandir stotra
Sarvanandi:Lokavibhaga(Text on Jain Cosmology)

 Tamil:
Tirukkural (Sacred verses)
 Silappatikaram (The Tale of the Anklet)
 Pahlavi:
 Matigan-i Hazar Datistan (The Thousand Laws of the Magistan)
 Frahang-i Oim-evak (Pahlavi-Avestan dictionary)
 Pali (Sri Lanka)
 Buddhaghosa: Visuddhimagga (The Path of Purification)
 Latin: see Late Latin
 Publius Flavius Vegetius Renatus: De Re Militari
 Augustine of Hippo: The City of God
 Paulus Orosius: Seven Books of History Against the Pagans
 Jerome: Vulgate
 Prudentius: Psychomachia
 Consentius's grammar
 Pseudo-Dionysius the Areopagite: De Coelesti Hierarchia (Περὶ τῆς Οὐρανίας Ἱεραρχίας, "On the Celestial Hierarchy"), Mystical Theology
 Socrates of Constantinople: Historia Ecclesiastica
 Greek:
 Nonnus: Dionysiaca

6th century
 Latin: Boethius, De consolatione philosophiae ("The Consolation of Philosophy", 524).
 Aramaic: Babylonian Talmud
Sanskrit:
Varāhamihira:Pañcasiddhāntikā ("[Treatise] on the Five [Astronomical] Canons"), Brihat-Samhita(Great Compilation)Encyclopedic Work
Yativṛṣabha:Tiloya Panatti(Book on Cosmology and Mathematics)
Virahanka
Prabhākara:Triputipratyaksavada ("Doctrine of Triple Perception")
Dharmakirti:Saṃbandhaparikṣhāvrtti (Analysis of Relations),Pramāṇaviniścaya (Ascertainment of Valid Cognition),Nyāyabinduprakaraṇa (Drop of Logic),Hetubindunāmaprakaraṇa (Drop of Reason),Saṃtānāntarasiddhināmaprakaraṇa (Proof of Others' Mindstreams),Vādanyāyanāmaprakaraṇa (Reasoning for Debate)
Praśastapāda :Padārtha-dharma-saṅgraha (Collection of Properties of Matter) 
Bhāviveka:Heart of the Middle, Wisdom Lamp
Udyotakara:Nyāyavārttika(Work on logic)
Gaudapada:Mandukya Karika
 Sinhalese: 
 Wansaththppakāsinī (Sinhalese translation of the Pali Mahāvaṃsa)
 Sigiriya Poems ( Poems written by visitors to the citadel of Sigiriya)
Pali (Sri Lanka): Cūḷavaṃsa
 Irish: Early Irish literature
 Dallán Forgaill: Amra (life of St Columba)

See also

 Early Medieval literature
 List of languages by first written accounts
 List of years in literature
 List of oldest documents
 List of Hebrew Bible manuscripts
 Biblical manuscript

References

 
01